Blank Canvas may refer to:

 Blank Canvas, a documentary film
 Blank Canvas: My So-Called Artist's Journey, an autobiographical comic by Akiko Higashimura
 Live at the Blank Canvas, a live DVD album by The Music
 Black Hole/Blank Canvas, an album by Motorpsycho